Virginia's 37th Senate district is one of 40 districts in the Senate of Virginia. It has been represented by Democrat Dave Marsden since a hotly contested 2010 special election to replace Republican Ken Cuccinelli, who had been elected Attorney General of Virginia.

Geography
District 37 is a serpentine district located entirely within Fairfax County in the suburbs of Washington, D.C., including some or all of Annandale, Kings Park, West Springfield, Burke, Fair Oaks, and Centreville, among other communities.

The district overlaps with Virginia's 8th, 10th, and 11th congressional districts, and with the 35th, 37th, 38th, 39th, 40th, 41st, 42nd, 53rd, and 67th districts of the Virginia House of Delegates.

Recent election results

2019

2015

2011

Federal and statewide results in District 37

Historical results
All election results below took place prior to 2011 redistricting, and thus were under different district lines.

2010 special

2007

2003

2002 special

1999

1995

References

Virginia Senate districts
Government in Fairfax County, Virginia